Rufus Nelson England (May 4, 1851 – November 28, 1911) was a merchant and political figure in Quebec. He represented Brome in the Legislative Assembly of Quebec from 1889 to 1897 as a Conservative.

He was born in Knowlton, Canada East, the son of Israël England and Mary Villiers Curtis, and was educated at the Knowlton Academy and Stanstead College. England was a telegraph operator for the Canadian Pacific Railway and postmaster at Knowlton. He was first elected to the Quebec assembly in an 1889 by-election held after William Warren Lynch was named a judge. He was married twice: first to a Miss Beach and then, in 1890, to Mary Cornelia Lambkin. England died in Montreal at the age of 60 and was buried in Knowlton, Quebec.

References
 

1851 births
1911 deaths
Conservative Party of Quebec MNAs